Andreas Daniel Onea (born 9 July 1992) is an Austrian Paralympic swimmer. He represented Austria at the Summer Paralympics in 2012, 2016 and 2020. In 2016, he won the bronze medal in the men's 100 metre breaststroke SB8 event.

Career
At the 2013 World Championships, he won the silver medal in the men's 100 metre breaststroke SB8 event. Two years later, at the 2015 World Championships, he won the bronze medal in the same event. At the 2016 IPC Swimming European Championships he won a silver medal in the men's 100m breaststroke SB8 and a bronze medal in the 200m individual medley SB8 event.

At the 2018 World Para Swimming European Championships he won a bronze medal in the men's 100 metres butterfly S8 event and a silver medal in the men's 200 metres individual medley S8 event.

In 2021, he represented Austria at the 2020 Summer Paralympics.

Personal life
His left arm got amputated after injuries sustained in a car accident.

References

External links 
 

1992 births
Living people
Austrian male breaststroke swimmers
Austrian male butterfly swimmers
Austrian male medley swimmers
Austrian people of Romanian descent
Austrian amputees
S8-classified Paralympic swimmers
Paralympic swimmers of Austria
Paralympic bronze medalists for Austria
Paralympic medalists in swimming
Swimmers at the 2012 Summer Paralympics
Swimmers at the 2016 Summer Paralympics
Swimmers at the 2020 Summer Paralympics
Medalists at the 2016 Summer Paralympics
Medalists at the World Para Swimming Championships
Medalists at the World Para Swimming European Championships
People from Zwettl
Sportspeople from Lower Austria
21st-century Austrian people